Laka, also known as Kabba Laka, is one of the Sara languages of Chad.

Laka of Lau, spoken in Nigeria, is closely related.

Literature
A New Testament in Kabba-Laka was published by the British and Foreign Bible Society in 1960. It was translated by Brethren Missionary Mrs. Matilda W. Kennedy with the assistants of Pierre Ngondje and Paul Bobeta.

References

External links
The Sara-Bagirmi Language Project -- Laka

Languages of Chad
Bongo–Bagirmi languages